Barratts was a brand of high street shoe shops operating in the UK and Ireland. The Barratts shoes brand traded from 100 UK and Ireland stores.

The company was established in Northampton in 1903, and became a highly successful brand known for its lavishly produced boot catalogues during the 1920s. In 1964, it was bought by the company Stylo and, under the Barratts brand name, expanded to over 400 stores at its height, before foreign competition in the 1990s reduced its market share.

Barratts entered administration for the third time in five years on 11 November 2013.

History

W Barratt Boot and Shoe Company was established in 1903 by William Barratt, and soon became one of the leading shoe manufacturers in Northampton. In 1913 it moved into a neo-Baroque factory designed by John Macvicar Anderson. The Barratts brand entered a new era of prosperity in the 1920s with the publication of luxurious promotional catalogues, including specially commissioned artwork and decorative pages. The 1923 catalogue featured an endorsement by the famed couturier Lady Duff Gordon, who also contributed an illustrated introduction to the women's section of this edition. The firm continued to flourish into the mid-20th century under the advertising slogan "Walk the Barratt Way".

Stylo was a family-run business which originated in 1935, with the consolidation of three separate companies the company was floated on the London Stock Exchange under the trade name Stylo Boot Company (Northern) Ltd. Having grown to 150 outlets, in 1964 Stylo bought W Barratt and Company, and merged the two businesses in Bradford.

Developing under the better known Barratts brand, the company developed to over 400 retail outlets. In the 1996 Barratts purchased Bacons Shoes, ran. The Bacon family in the West Midlands. Bacon's shoes brand was phased out by the Managing Director, Ron Arthur Stark, from 1997 and converted the Bacons stores to Priceless. The first Priceless store conversion was in Sunderland, from a Hush Puppies store and was an instant success, selling self service shoes. The Shoe and Sport Depot brand, ran by Peter Peregrine Lee were converted to Priceless brand, originally created by Ron Arthur Stark. The Priceless brand was fully operational by 1999. Based in Apperley Bridge, Bradford, West Yorkshire, the new company operated over 300 UK and Ireland concessions across the Arcadia Group, including within Dorothy Perkins, as well as supporting the Group's online activity. Barratts also had an online presence with the retailer Wallis.

On 13 February 2008, Stylo purchased 24 stores from collapsed shoe retailer Dolcis as well as the Dolcis brand name. The shops were rebranded as Barratts.

Difficulties
Following a trading loss of £12.5 million in 2008, on 26 January 2009, Stylo's shares were suspended. Barratts and PriceLess soon went into administration and on 13 February 2009, Stylo itself went into administration. On 19 February 2009, administrators Deloitte announced that 220 Barratt and PriceLess stores would be closing, with the loss of approximately 2,500 jobs.

The remaining 160 stores and 165 concessions, plus the Barratts and Priceless brands, were sold to a management team led by Michael Ziff, under Barratts Priceless Ltd (BPL). In December 2011, BPL called in administrators Deloitte, who immediately closed 100 stores and 359 concessions, resulting in 2,500 job losses. In January 2012, a management team led by CEO Ziff bought 89 Barratts and Priceless stores through a new company, Barratts Trading Ltd. This sold through both its own stores and e-commerce website, plus online retailers Amazon.com, Debenhams and eBay.

In 2013, just before administration, Barratts closed its Jersey store, which is now occupied by Paperchase.

In October 2013, it was reported that the business was suffering a cash flow crisis as it struggled to purchase new stock in the run-up to Christmas. On 11 November 2013, it was confirmed the company had entered administration, with 18 immediate store closures.

The retailer Pavers Shoes purchased 14 Barratts stores in December 2013. In January 2014, the Barratts brand and website were purchased by the footwear entrepreneur Harvey Jacobsen and the former buying and merchandising director of Barratts, Simon Robson.

Stylo Matchmakers 
In 1966 the Stylo Matchmakers sports brand was first founded by Barratts Shoes in Bradford, United Kingdom, in the West Yorkshire area. 
History. Barratts Shoes shareholder and entrepreneur Paul Ziff, younger brother of Arnold Ziff created the Stylo Matchmakers brand with the help of IMG founder Mark McCormack. Together the pair announced they were going to make a one of the first commercialized sportswear brand pursuing England’s most popular sports, which included tennis, golf, and football. In tennis, the number one ranking professional player for over 7 years, Rod Laver found great success in Stylo Matchmakers tennis shoes. 

With a wider span throughout the late 1960s and 1970s, the Stylo Matchmakers brand was more commonly worn in football. Among some of the hundreds of professional players who wore Stylo Matchmakers were Brazilian legend Pelé, and Northern Irish striker George Best.

Whilst Stylo Matchmakers broke records with some of the biggest names in English football, it also went on to become one of the fastest-selling brands in golf. Making its way to the USA, Stylo Matchmakers footwear was promoted and endorsed by some of the greatest golfers of all time, including Billy Casper, Nick Faldo MBE, and Arnold Palmer. Eventually, due to the ill health of the brand founder Paul Ziff in the early nineties, Stylo Matchmakers eventually deceased.
 
In May 2017 the Stylo Matchmakers brand was registered globally and returned by British entrepreneur and sports agent Scott Michaels.  Whilst under new ownership and the disruptive direction of Mr Michaels, Stylo Matchmakers became leaders in the “Against Modern Football” campaign and positioned the brand as a none conformist towards the modern game with its classic styling.

References

Retail companies established in 1903
Retail companies disestablished in 2013
Companies based in the City of Bradford
Shoe companies of the United Kingdom
Companies formerly listed on the London Stock Exchange
British companies established in 1903
British companies disestablished in 2013
Companies that have entered administration in the United Kingdom
Defunct retail companies of the United Kingdom